Senator Rodriguez or Rodríguez may refer to:

Celestino Rodriguez (1872–1955), Senate of the Philippines
Eugene Rodriguez (politician) (born 1929), New York State Senate
Eulogio Rodriguez (1883–1964), Senate of the Philippines
Justo A. Méndez Rodriguez (1917–1995), Senate of Puerto Rico
Nancy Rodriguez (born 1953), New Mexico State Senate
Robert Rodriguez (politician), Colorado State Senate
Charlie Rodríguez (born 1954), Senate of Puerto Rico
Gilberto Rodríguez (born 1975), Senate of Puerto Rico
José R. Rodríguez (born 1948), Texas State Senate
Larry Seilhamer Rodríguez (born 1954), Senate of Puerto Rico
Maribel Rodríguez (fl. 2000s), Senate of Puerto Rico
Pedro A. Rodríguez (born 1968), Senate of Puerto Rico
Pedro Rodríguez y Lazala (1869–1932), Senate of the Philippines

See also
Michael Rodrigues (politician) (born 1959), Massachusetts State Senate